"Slow Grenade" is a song by English singer Ellie Goulding featuring American singer Lauv, released as the third single from Goulding's fourth studio album Brightest Blue, through Polydor Records on 30 June 2020. It was written by Goulding, Lauv, Leland, and its producers Joe Kearns and Oscar Görres.

Background and release
Goulding announced the song on social media on 29 June. It was released on 30 June and a lyric video was released on 3 July.

Charts

Release history

References

2020 songs
Ellie Goulding songs
Lauv songs
Songs written by Ellie Goulding
Songs written by Lauv
Songs written by Leland (musician)
Songs written by Oscar Görres